Zoltán Csehi (born 22 July 1972) is a Hungarian former professional footballer who played as a forward. He played in Hungary for various teams, among them: Nyíregyháza Spartacus, Kecskemét, Debrecen and Videoton. In Romania Csehi played for Bihor Oradea and Liberty Salonta.

External links
 
 Zoltán Csehi at magyarfutball.hu

1972 births
Living people
Hungarian footballers
Nemzeti Bajnokság I players
Nyíregyháza Spartacus FC players
Kecskeméti TE players
Debreceni VSC players
Fehérvár FC players
Liga II players
FC Bihor Oradea players
CF Liberty Oradea players
Hungarian expatriate footballers
Hungarian expatriate sportspeople in Romania
Expatriate footballers in Romania
Association football forwards